The Final Cut is an original novel written by Matt Smith and based on the long-running British science fiction comic strip Judge Dredd from 2000 AD. At the time of publication (2005) Smith was editor of 2000 AD.

Synopsis
Some mutilated murder victims are discovered in a radioactive bomb site.

External links
The Final Cut at the 2000 AD website.
Review at 2000adreview

Judge Dredd novels
2005 novels
Novels set in the 22nd century